The Ladies' Los Angeles Open was a golf tournament on the LPGA Tour, played only in 1967. It was played at the Montebello Municipal Golf Course in Montebello, California. Kathy Whitworth won the event by four strokes over Murle Lindstrom.

References

Former LPGA Tour events
Golf in California
Sports competitions in Los Angeles County, California
Montebello, California
1967 establishments in California
1967 disestablishments in California
Women's sports in California